U-am san (우암산, 牛岩山) is a 353.2meter peak in Chungju City, Chungcheongbuk-do, South Korea.

Mountains of South Korea
Mountains of North Chungcheong Province